The Roșcani is a left tributary of the river Chineja in Romania. It flows into the Chineja in Măstăcani.

References

Rivers of Romania
Rivers of Galați County